Lake Wilson is a lake in Murray County, in the U.S. state of Minnesota.

Lake Wilson was named for Jonathan E. Wilson, a local landowner.

See also
List of lakes in Minnesota

References

Lakes of Minnesota
Lakes of Murray County, Minnesota